Óscar Martín Hernández (born 9 September 1988) is a Spanish footballer who plays for CF Villanovense as an attacking midfielder.

Club career
Born in Arrecife, Lanzarote, Canary Islands, Martín was formed at local UD Lanzarote, making his first-team debut in 2007 in Segunda División B. On 10 August 2009 he moved to fellow league side CD Tenerife B, suffering relegation in his first year.

On 24 August 2011, Martín joined CF Villanovense also of the third level. He continued to compete in that tier in the following years, representing Real Balompédica Linense and La Roda CF.

On 9 June 2016, after scoring a career-best seven goals during the season, Martín moved abroad for the first time in his career after signing with I liga club Miedź Legnica. He played his first match as a professional on 29 July, starting in a 1–0 home win against Górnik Zabrze; he left Poland the following 18 January after 17 goalless appearances, and returned to his homeland the same month after agreeing to a contract at UD Socuéllamos.

References

External links

1988 births
Living people
People from Lanzarote
Sportspeople from the Province of Las Palmas
Spanish footballers
Footballers from the Canary Islands
Association football midfielders
Segunda División B players
Tercera División players
CD Tenerife B players
CF Villanovense players
Real Balompédica Linense footballers
La Roda CF players
San Fernando CD players
I liga players
Miedź Legnica players
Spanish expatriate footballers
Expatriate footballers in Poland
Spanish expatriate sportspeople in Poland